Monardella frutescens is a rare species of flowering plant in the mint family known by the common name San Luis Obispo monardella.

Distribution
Monardella frutescens is endemic to California, where it is known only from the sand dunes and coastal sage and chaparral scrub on the coastline of San Luis Obispo and Santa Barbara Counties.

Description
Monardella frutescens is a perennial herb producing several purple stems. The thin, narrow, wavy-edged leaves are 1 to 5 centimeters long and borne in clusters along the stem. The inflorescence is a head of several flowers blooming in a cup of papery purplish to straw-colored bracts. The flowers are purple to pink in color. This species sometimes hybridizes with its relative, Monardella crispa, which shares its habitat.

References

External links
Jepson Manual Treatment - Monardella frutescens
USDA Plants Profile: Monardella frutescens
Monardella frutescens - Photo gallery

frutescens
Endemic flora of California
Natural history of the California chaparral and woodlands
Natural history of San Luis Obispo County, California
Natural history of Santa Barbara County, California